Beach Spike (Yit long kau oi jin 熱浪球愛戰) is a 2011 Hong Kong film directed by Tony Tang. The film involves a female beach volleyball teams with martial arts skills. It has a proposed cast of veteran actors Bolo Yeung and Ronald Cheng along with the female leads of Theresa Fu, Chrissie Chau, Phoenix Chou and Ankie Beilke.

Plot
In Hong Kong's Paradise Cove Sharon (Chrissie Chau) and Rachel (Theresa Fu) work at a restaurant of their kung fu master uncle Tao (Lo Mang) while taking on rivals in beach volleyball matches.
The wealthy Bu family has plans to have the beach made into a playground for the rich and getting rid of the youth at the beach. Mrs. Bu's two Eurasian daughters, Natalie (Jessica C) and Natasha (Phoenix Chou) challenge Sharon and Rachel to a volleyball match which Natalie and Natasha win.
Natasha and Natalie give Rachel and Sharon a challenge: if the two local girls enter and win the upcoming All Hong Kong Women's Volleyball tournament, Mrs. Bu will revise her plans to further develop the area. Sharon and Rachel feel they don't have a chance to win the tournament. Their uncle then Tao teaches the girls kung fu skills that they apply to volleyball.

Cast
Chrissie Chau as Sharon
Theresa Fu as Rachel
Jessica C as Natalie
Him Law as Tim
Alex Lam as Water
Lam Suet as Water's father
Lo Mang as Uncle Tao
Sharon Yeung as Auntie Tao
Phoenix Chou as Natasha
Candice Yu as Mrs. Bro
Philip Ng as Coach
La Ying as SingSing

Production
Beach Spike is the live-action feature debut of animator Tony Tang, who previously directed the actress Chrissie Chau in a Slim Beauty television commercial in 2009, where she rips open her office outfit to reveal herself in a bikini. The film was set to shoot in Nanhai and Hong Kong. Beach Spike is the second film after The Blood Bond to come from producer Bey Logan's B&E Productions. The film was partially funded by the Hong Kong Film Development Fund who approved $2,799,836.00 for it in June 2010. Chau took three months of volleyball training to prepare for her role in Beach Spike. While working on Beach Spike during the day, Chau and Him Law were shooting the scenes for Marriage with a Liar by night. Production on Beach Spike ended in late September 2010.

Release
Beach Spike was released in Hong Kong on 7 July 2011. It was the fourth highest-grossing film in the Hong Kong box office on its opening week. In total, the film has grossed $191,748.

Notes

External links
 
 

Hong Kong romantic comedy films
2011 films
Volleyball films
2010s Cantonese-language films
Films set in Hong Kong
Films shot in Hong Kong